The 2011 Newcastle Knights season was the 24th in the club's history. Coached by Rick Stone and captained by Kurt Gidley, they competed in the NRL's 2011 Telstra Premiership. The Knights finished the regular season in 8th place (out of 16), thus reaching the finals but were knocked out after losing to the Melbourne Storm in week 1.

Milestones
Round 1: Neville Costigan made his debut for the club, after previously playing for the St. George Illawarra Dragons.
Round 1: Beau Henry made his NRL debut for the club and scored his 1st career try.
Round 6: Tyrone Roberts made his NRL debut for the club.
Round 6: Steve Southern made his debut for the club, after previously playing for the North Queensland Cowboys.
Round 10: Marvin Filipo made his NRL debut for the club.
Round 11: Peter Mata'utia made his NRL debut for the club and scored his 1st career try.
Round 13: Neville Costigan scored his 1st try for the club.
Round 13: Antonio Kaufusi scored his 1st try for the club.
Round 15: Ryan Stig made his NRL debut for the club.
Round 16: Wes Naiqama captained his 1st game for the club.
Round 17: Ryan Stig scored his 1st career try.
Round 19: Ryan Stig kicked his 1st career goal.
Round 20: Zane Tetevano made his NRL debut for the club.
Round 25: Siuatonga Likiliki made his debut for the club, after previously playing for the New Zealand Warriors.
Round 25: Zane Tetevano scored his 1st career try.
Round 26: Adam MacDougall kicked his 1st career goal.
Round 26: Akuila Uate scored 4 tries, equalling Darren Albert, Adam MacDougall, Andrew Johns and Cooper Vuna's record of most tries scored in a match by 1 player for the Knights.

Squad

Transfers and Re-signings

Gains

Losses

Promoted juniors

Re-signings

Player contract situations

Ladder

Jerseys and sponsors
In 2011, the Knights' jerseys were made by XBlades and their major sponsor was Coal & Allied.

Fixtures

Pre-season trials

Regular season
2011 Regular season fixtures

Statistics

33 players used.

Source:

Representative honours

The following players appeared in a representative match in 2011.

Australia
Akuila Uate

Cook Islands
Keith Lulia
Zeb Taia
Zane Tetevano

Indigenous All Stars
Cory Paterson

Italy
Cameron Ciraldo

Junior Kangaroos
Tyrone Roberts (18th man)

New South Wales
Kurt Gidley (captain)
Akuila Uate

New South Wales Country
Chris Houston
Jarrod Mullen
Akuila Uate

New South Wales Residents
Constantine Mika
Rip Taylor (assistant coach)

New South Wales under-18s
Pat Mata'utia
Ben Roose
Tom Rouse
Michael Steele

NRL All Stars
Kurt Gidley
Akuila Uate

Queensland under-18s
Kurt Mann

Tonga
Richard Fa'aoso

Individual honours

Dally M awards
Dally M Winger of the Year
Akuila Uate

Newcastle Knights awards

Player of the Year
National Youth Competition (NYC) Player of the Year: Sam Anderson

Players' Player
National Youth Competition (NYC) Players' Player: Sam Anderson

References

Newcastle Knights seasons
Newcastle Knights season